A-Z Luxemburger Illustrierte was a German-language newspaper published in Luxembourg published between 1933 and 1940. The paper was published weekly.

References

1933 establishments in Luxembourg
1940 disestablishments in Luxembourg
Defunct newspapers published in Luxembourg
Defunct weekly newspapers
German-language newspapers published in Luxembourg
Publications established in 1933
Publications disestablished in 1940
Weekly newspapers published in Luxembourg